Matros is a surname literally meaning "seaman" in several languages. Notable people with the surname include:
Larisa Matros
Matt Matros
Yurii Matros

See also